Cerastidae is a family of air-breathing land snails, terrestrial pulmonate gastropod mollusks in the order Stylommatophora.

Genera
 Achatinelloides Nevill, 1878
 Altenaia Zilch, 1972
 Amimopina Solem, 1964
 Archeorachis Schileyko, 1998
 Cerastus E. von Martens, 1860 
 Conulinus E. von Martens, 1895
 Darwininitium Budha & Mordan, 2012
 Euryptyxis P. Fischer, 1883
 Gittenedouardia Bank & Menkhorst, 2008
 Hoqia Neubert, 2005
 Limicena Connolly, 1925
 Microscintilla Neubert, 2002
 Nesiocerastus Van Mol & Coppois, 1980
 Nesobia Ancey, 1887
 Pachnodus E. von Martens, 1860
 Paracerastus Thiele, 1934
 Passamaella Clessin, 1878
 Pleurorhachis Connolly, 1938
 Polychordia Connolly, 1941
 Rachis Albers, 1850
 Rhachidina Thiele, 1911
 Rhachistia Connolly, 1925
 Soqena Neubert, 2005
 Zebrinops Thiele, 1931

Description
Anatomically speaking, there is no flagellum in the reproductive system of snails in the family Cerastidae, and this is what distinguishes this family from its sister group the family Enidae.

References

External links
 Wenz, W. (1923–1930). Fossilium Catalogus I: Animalia. Gastropoda extramarina tertiaria. W. Junk, Berlin. Vol. I: 1–352 pp. (1923), Vol. II: 353–736 pp. (1923), Vol. III: 737–1068 pp. (1923), Vol. IV: 1069–1420 pp. (1923), Vol. V: 1421–1734 pp. (1923), Vol. VI: 1735–1862 pp. (1923), Vol. VII: 1863–2230 pp. (1926), Vol. VIII: 2231–2502 pp. (1928), Vol. IX: 2503–2886 pp. (1929), Vol. X: 2887–3014 pp. (1929), Vol. XI: 3015–3387 pp. (1930)

 
Gastropod families